"The Town" is the third episode of the twenty-eighth season of the American animated television series The Simpsons, and the 599th episode of the series overall. It aired in the United States on Fox on October 9, 2016.

In the episode, Bart enrages Homer by becoming a fan of the Boston Americans (a parody of the New England Patriots). Homer takes the family on a "hate-cation" to Boston to show Bart how bad the city is, but the family fall in love with the city and move there. However, Bart soon discovers that Boston is not how he imagined it, and wants to go home.

"The Town" received positive reviews and was the most watched show on Fox that night, with an audience of 3.22 million. It was nominated for the Primetime Emmy Award for Outstanding Animated Program.

Plot
Homer goes to Moe's Tavern to watch a football game between the Springfield Atoms and the Boston Americans, but they end up bitterly arguing with a group of Boston fans, calling their team cheaters and losers. Homer and the rest become enraged when the Americans win the game by throwing to their mascot, who was activated for the 53-man roster and reported in as an eligible receiver. Homer then says that he will lose his temper if he sees a Boston fan, but seconds later, he is surprised by a gleeful Bart wearing a Boston Americans cap, as his son makes it plain he hates the hometown Atoms and loves Boston. Homer gets angry at Bart, but he decides to take him around Springfield to encourage him to cheer for the home team. Bart refuses and admits that people from Boston, specifically Southies, are his people. Homer gets so traumatized that he decides to take the family on a "hate-cation" to Boston to show Bart what a terrible place it actually is.

During a visit to Faneuil Hall Marketplace, Homer unsuccessfully attempts to provoke the Bostonians when a cart full of bobbleheads falls on him. When he is helped by doctors, Marge is impressed with the Massachusetts health care system, as much as Lisa is impressed by the MIT campus. Meanwhile, Homer and Bart go candlepin bowling and, when Homer learns that the player gets a third ball in this version of the sport, he falls in love with both it and the city. Homer gives up on the hate-cation and decides to enjoy Boston with Bart. Back at the hotel, Marge and Homer talk about their experience in Boston and decide to move to the town, declaring the move to be their "third ball".

The Simpsons rent an apartment and move all their possessions to Boston. Homer finds a job at the NEKCO candy factory and Lisa enjoys attending the Combat Zone Charter School. However, Bart realizes that he can no longer keep his reputation as a bad boy in school, as the children in detention focused their energy into a cappella singing, and that most of the town is made for intellectuals like Lisa. He decides to find a way to make the family move back to Springfield. Bart takes the family to the latest championship parade for the Americans, who used questionable tactics to win the crown. Homer tries to control his anger, but he gets enraged when asked to put on a Boston Americans cap, ripping it in two and yelling that they are cheaters. The Simpsons then have to move back to Springfield, where Marge gets mad at Homer for making them lose that opportunity, but concludes that it would not have worked out for the family in Boston, as their problems are who they are, not where they are. Bart is now wearing a Springfield Atoms cap and Lisa is hallucinating about Boston.

Production
The episode was originally titled "Patriot Games", as seen in the script cover. However, the title was changed in January 2016 to "The Town". On Twitter, producer Matt Selman posted a still image from a deleted scene, in which Bart rides a city bike.

"The Town" was rerun by Fox on February 12, 2017, a week after Super Bowl LI, where the New England Patriots defeated the Atlanta Falcons 34–28 in the first-ever Super Bowl game to enter overtime. As an easter egg, the final score of the Boston vs. Springfield football game was changed to reference the real-life result of Super Bowl LI. Selman explained that his team had proposed the idea whilst watching the game, having realized that "The Town" had been scheduled for a rerun the following week. Although the idea was a joke, Al Jean took it seriously. He added that "jamming the Super Bowl teams and score into one shot makes no sense in the show, but we couldn't resist." The edit was exclusive to this airing. The episode was season 28, episode 3. The Patriots came back from a 28-3 deficit to win the Super Bowl.

Cultural references
The "Boston Americans" are a parody of the New England Patriots; their anthem I'm Shipping Up to Boston is sang by the school a capella group. Former Patriots player Rob Gronkowski is also parodied as "Bonkowski".

Reception
"The Town" scored a 1.5 rating and was watched by 3.22 million viewers, making it the most-watched show on Fox that night.

"The Town" received positive reviews from critics. Dennis Perkins of The A.V. Club gave the episode a "B."  He recognized writer Dave King's experiences from Harvard University and the sports blog, Fire Joe Morgan, and praised the cutting of the opening titles to fill the story. Screen Rant called it the best episode of the 28th season.

This is season 28, episode 3. Several months later, the New England Patriots (Boston Americans) would rally from a 28-3 deficit in Super Bowl LI

The episode was nominated for Outstanding Animated Program at the 69th Primetime Creative Arts Emmy Awards, losing to the Bob's Burgers episode, "Bob Actually".

References

External links
 

2016 American television episodes
The Simpsons (season 28) episodes
Television episodes set in Boston
New England Patriots